Kaum De Heere (English translation: Gems of the Community or Diamonds of the Community) is a 2014 Indian Punjabi-language film based on the lives of Satwant Singh, Beant Singh and Kehar Singh, who assassinated Indira Gandhi.

The Delhi High Court (on 29 August 2019) has allowed the release of Punjabi film “Kaum De Heere” which was slated to be released in August 2014 and set aside CBFC's earlier order withdrawing movie's certification for public screening.

Cast
 Raj Kakra as Beant Singh.
 Sukhdeep Sukh as Satwant Singh
 Isha Sharma as Surinder Kaur
 Sardar Sohi as Kehar Singh

References

2014 films
Assassination of Indira Gandhi
Films about massacres of Sikhs
Punjabi-language Indian films
2010s Punjabi-language films
Censorship in India
Films based on 1984 anti-Sikh riots
Fictional portrayals of the Delhi Police
Fictional portrayals of the Punjab Police (India)